The following railroads are operating in the U.S. state of Illinois.

Current railroads

Common freight carriers 
 A&R Terminal Railroad (ART)
 AgRail (AGRL)
 Ag Valley Railroad  (AVRR)
 Alton and Southern Railway (ALS)
 Belt Railway of Chicago (BRC)
 Bloomer Line (BLOL)
 BNSF Railway (BNSF)
 Burlington Junction Railway (BJRY) also operates City of Rochelle Railroad (CIR)
 Canadian National Railway (CN) through subsidiaries Chicago Central and Pacific Railroad (CC), Elgin, Joliet and Eastern Railway (EJE), Grand Trunk Western Railroad (GTW), Illinois Central Railroad (IC), and Wisconsin Central Ltd. (WC)
 Canadian Pacific Railway (CP) through subsidiaries Dakota, Minnesota and Eastern Railroad (DME) and Soo Line Railroad (SOO)
 Chicago–Chemung Railroad (CCUO)
 Chicago Port Railroad (CPC)
 Chicago Rail Link (CRL)
 Chicago South Shore and South Bend Railroad (CSS)
 Cicero Central Railroad (CCER)
 Coffeen and Western Railroad (CAEG)
 Crab Orchard and Egyptian Railroad (COER)
 CSX Transportation (CSXT) including subsidiary Baltimore and Ohio Chicago Terminal Railroad (BOCT)
 Decatur Central Railroad
 Decatur & Eastern Illinois Railroad (DREI)
 Decatur Junction Railway (DT)
 Eastern Illinois Railroad (EIRC)
 Effingham Railroad (EFRR)
 Evansville Western Railway (EVWR) 
 FFG&C Railroad (FFGC)
 Great Lakes Terminal Railway (GLTR)
 Hussey Terminal Railroad (HTRC) (Out of Service)
 Illinois Railway (IR)
 Illinois and Midland Railroad (IMRR)
 Illinois Western Railroad (ILW)
 Indiana Harbor Belt Railroad (IHB)
 Indiana Rail Road (INRD)
 Iowa Interstate Railroad (IAIS) operates Lincoln and Southern Railroad
 Joppa and Eastern Railroad (JE)
 Kankakee, Beaverville and Southern Railroad (KBSR)
 Kansas City Southern Railway (KCS) including subsidiary Gateway Eastern Railway (GWWE)
 Keokuk Junction Railway (KJRY)
 KM Railways (KMR)
 Manufacturers' Junction Railway (MJ) (Out of Service)
 Norfolk Southern Railway (NS)
 Peru Industrial Railroad (PIRR)
 Pioneer Industrial Railway (PRY)
 Port Harbor Railroad (PHRR)
 Riverport Railroad (RVPR)
 Shawnee Terminal Railway (STR) (Out of Service)
 South Chicago and Indiana Harbor Railway (SCIH)
 Tazewell and Peoria Railroad (TZPR) operates Peoria and Pekin Union Railway (PPU)
 Terminal Railroad Association of St. Louis (TRRA)
 Toledo, Peoria and Western Railway (TPW)
 Union Pacific Railroad (UP) including subsidiary Southern Illinois and Missouri Bridge Company
 Vandalia Railroad (VRRC)
 Vermilion Valley Railroad (VVRR) operates FNG Logistics Company (FNG)
 Wisconsin and Southern Railroad (WSOR)

Private freight carriers 
 ADM Milling (ADMX)
 Aux Sable Midstream
 Bulkmatic Railroad
 Buzzi Unicem
 Centerpoint Transportation, LLC
Operates the Joliet Terminal Railroad
 Hoffman Transportation (HTCX)
 Ingredion
 Kaskaskia Regional Port District (KKRX)
 Mars Candy
 Material Sciences Corporation
 Mokena Illinois Railroad
 R Bult Rail Lines

Proposed railroads 
 505 Railroad
 Beecher Industrial Railway
 Crete Terminal Railroad
 Eastern Joliet Railway
 Great Lakes Basin Transportation

Passenger carriers 
 Amtrak (AMTK)
 Chicago Transit Authority
 Fox River Trolley Museum (Aurora, Elgin and Fox River Electric)
 Illinois Railway Museum
 Metra
 MetroLink
 Monticello Railway Museum
 Silver Creek and Stephenson Railroad
 South Shore Line

Defunct railroads

Electric railways and predecessors 
 Aurora, Elgin and Chicago Railroad
 Aurora, Elgin and Fox River Electric Company
 Alton, Jacksonville and Peoria Railway
 Bloomington, Pontiac and Joliet Electric Railway
 Cairo and St. Louis Railway
 Calumet and South Chicago Railway
 Central Illinois Public Service Company
 Centralia and Central City Traction Company
 Chicago, Aurora and DeKalb Railroad
 Chicago Aurora and Elgin Railroad
 Chicago City Railway
 Chicago and Desplaines Valley Electric Railway
 Chicago General Railway
 Chicago, Harvard and Geneva Lake Railway (CH&G)
 Chicago and Joliet Electric Railway
 Chicago, Lake Shore and South Bend Railway
 Chicago and Milwaukee Electric Railroad
 Chicago North Shore and Milwaukee Railroad
 Chicago, Ottawa and Peoria Railway (CO&P)
 Chicago South Shore and South Bend Railroad
 Chicago and South Side Rapid Transit Railroad
 Chicago and Southern Traction Company
 Chicago Surface Lines
 Chicago Tunnel Company
 Chicago, Wheaton and Western Railway
 Coal Belt Electric Railway
 DeKalb – Sycamore and Interurban Traction Company
 East St. Louis and Suburban Railway
 Elgin, Aurora and Southern Traction Company
 Elgin and Belvidere Electric Company
 Fruit Growers Refrigerating and Power Company
 Galesburg Railway and Light Company
 Galesburg and Kewanee Electric Railway
 Illinois Central Electric Railway
 Illinois Traction, Inc. (ITS)
 Illinois Valley Railway
 Illinois Valley Traction Company
 Joliet and Southern Traction Company
 Kankakee and Western Electric Railway
 Keokuk and Western Illinois Electric Company
 Lake Street Elevated Railroad
 Lee County Central Electric Railway
 Macomb and Western Illinois Railway
 Metropolitan West Side Elevated Railroad
 Mississippi Valley Interurban Railway
 Moline, East Moline and Watertown Railway
 North Kankakee Electric Light and Railway Company
 Northern Illinois Electric Railway
 Northwestern Elevated Railroad
 Peoples Traction Company
 Peoria Railway
 Peoria and Pekin Terminal Railway
 Peoria and Pekin Traction Company
 Peoria Railway Terminal Company
 Rock Island Southern Railway (RIS)
 Rockford, Beloit and Janesville Railroad
 Rockford and Belvidere Electric Railway
 Rockford and Interurban Railway
  St. Louis and Belleville Electric Railway
 South Side Elevated Railroad
 Southern Traction Company of Illinois
 Sterling, Dixon and Eastern Electric Railway
 Suburban Railroad
 Terre Haute, Indianapolis and Eastern Traction Company
 Tri-City Railway
 Union Consolidated Elevated Railway
 Woodstock and Sycamore Traction Company

Notes

References

External links
 Chicago & Alton Railroad Miscellaneous, McLean County Museum of History

 
 
Railroads
Illinois